Taverner is an opera with music and libretto by Peter Maxwell Davies. It is based on the life of the 16th-century English composer John Taverner, but in what Davies himself acknowledged was a non-realistic treatment. The gestation for the opera dated as far back as 1956 during Davies's years in Manchester, and continued when he went to Princeton University in 1962. Davies produced several instrumental works related to the opera during this gestation period, including the Points and Dances from 'Taverner''' and the Second Fantasia on John Taverner's "In Nomine". Davies had completed the opera in 1968, but lost parts of the score in a fire at his Dorset cottage in 1969, which necessitated recomposition.

Davies employs a theme from the 'Benedictus' of Taverner's Mass Gloria Tibi Trinitas as a recurring motif throughout the work. This theme, taken from the section beginning 'in nomine [Domini]', gained popularity among later composers of the English renaissance in the form of the instrumental In Nomine. Stephen Arnold has written a detailed analysis of the music of the opera and of Davies's use of parody. The American composer John Harbison has published an analysis of the opera (working from the vocal score), contemporary with its first performances. Gabriel Josipovici has commented on the historical events that inspired the opera and on the libretto itself.

Performance history
The opera was first performed at Covent Garden, London, on 12 July 1972, with Edward Downes conducting, Michael Geliot as director and Ralph Koltai as designer.

The US premiere was in April 1985 at the Opera Company of Boston, under the direction of Sarah Caldwell.

Roles

Synopsis
Act 1Scene 1Taverner is put on trial before the White Abbot on charges of heresy. Testimony comes from his father and his mistress, as well as a priest and a choirboy. Taverner is found guilty, but the Cardinal pardons him, noting the composer's usefulness and naiveté.Scene 2Taverner's fate is mirrored in the chorus of monks as he ponders his conscience.Scene 3The King discusses his intended divorce with the Cardinal, with interruptions from the jester.Scene 4The court jester proves to be Death in disguise. A metaphorical battle for Taverner's soul then occurs, with his father and mistress in opposition to the jester/Death. The jester/Death prevails, and Taverner has become a religious fanatic.

Act 2Scene 1Taverner has become an instrument of royal religious policy, having abandoned his earlier Catholic faith for the new Protestant religion, in the wake of the Reformation. He presides over the conviction of the White Abbot on charges of heresy, with the same witnesses as in act 1, scene 1.Scene 2Discussion of the break with the Catholic Church and the founding of the Church of England takes place between the King, the Archbishop of Canterbury (formerly the Cardinal), and the jester/Death. The King speaks of his plan to annex the monasteries.Scene 3The monks are at their devotions. Soldiers, under orders from Taverner, take the monks prisoner.Scene 4The people praise Taverner and his brutal methods of justice. The White Abbot goes to his execution, under escort from Taverner.

Recordings
 NMC D157 (2 CDs). Cast includes Martyn Hill (John Taverner) and David Wilson-Johnson (Jester). BBC Symphony Orchestra, Fretwork, His Majesty's Sagbutts and Cornetts, and London Voices, conducted by Oliver Knussen. Taken from a 1996 BBC studio recording.

References

Further reading
 Holden, Amanda, ed. The New Penguin Opera Guide'', New York: Penguin Putnam, 2001 

Operas by Peter Maxwell Davies
English-language operas
Operas
1972 operas
Opera world premieres at the Royal Opera House
Operas set in England
Operas set in the 16th century